In 1884, following the recommendations of the  Jervois-Scratchley reports, the Queensland Marine Defence Force was established. To equip the new force, the Queensland colonial government purchased two gunboats and a torpedo boat.  Queensland bought eight more vessels to create the second largest fleet in the Australian colonies behind Victoria. With the federation of the Australian colonies, those vessels still in service joined the Commonwealth Naval Forces in 1901 and the Royal Australian Navy when it was formed in 1911. No ship ever met the enemy in battle or fell victim to enemy action despite the fact that most went on too long, albeit in some cases humble, careers in both naval and private hands past World War II.

Vessels in alphabetical order

B

D

G

M

O

P

S

Vessels in chronological order by class

Torpedo boat
 Mosquito

Gayundah-class gunboats
 Gayundah
 Paluma

Patrol vessel
 Otter

Auxiliary gunboats
 Bonito
 Bream
 Dolphin
 Pumba
 Stingaree

Torpedo launch
 Midge

Mining tender
Miner

See also
 List of Royal Australian Navy ships

Notes

References

 
Queensland Marine Defence Force ships
Ships of the Queensland Maritime Defence Force